Ephraim Foster Graham (Nashville, Tennessee August 10, 1888 – Fort Sam Houston, Texas, December 23, 1962) was an American horse rider who competed in the 1912 Summer Olympics.

Graham graduated from West Point in 1903, and was commissioned in the 10th Cavalry Regiment.

In 1912, he competed in the military riding event for the U.S. Military team. He and his horse Connie won the bronze medal as member of the American team in the team eventing after finishing twelfth in the individual eventing competition.

References

External links
list of American equestrians
 
 

1888 births
1962 deaths
American event riders
Equestrians at the 1912 Summer Olympics
American male equestrians
Olympic bronze medalists for the United States in equestrian
Medalists at the 1912 Summer Olympics